Reverend Willie Morganfield (July 11, 1927 – October 18, 2003), was an American gospel musician and minister. He started his music career, in 1959, with the release of a single, "What Is This?", which was made into a popular arrangement by the gospel music singer and pastor Walter Hawkins in 1980. His albums were primarily released by Jewel Records with a few by Paul Records. The only release that charted, Golden Hits, was released by Jewel in 1984, and this placed on the Billboard magazine Gospel Albums chart.

Early life
Morganfield was born on July 11, 1927 in Stovall, Mississippi. He was raised in Memphis, Tennessee by a father who preached at King Solomon's Church. He was the pastor of Bell Grove Baptist Church of Clarksdale, Mississippi, until his death.

He was a cousin of McKinley Morganfield, better known as the blues musician Muddy Waters, who also lived on the Stovall plantation.

Music career
His music recording career commenced with the single, "What Is This?", that became a gospel music standard, the likes of Brother Joe May would go on to record another version of the song already popular with gospel music radio stations at the time being the most played track. He released albums primarily with Jewel Records with a few released by Paula Records. The album, "Golden Hits" in 1984 with Jewel Records, was the only release to chart on a Billboard magazine list of the Gospel Albums, where it placed at No. 34.

Personal life
Reverend Willie Morganfield was married to Jane Anna Morganfield. Together, they were parents to Cassandra, Reginald, Delories, and Theresa Morganfield. Their grandchildren include Cynthia Williams, Tiffany Williams, Tanesha Williams, Regina Chambers and Cory Williams. Their great grandchildren include Rayshun Williams and Jayden Williams. Reverend Morganfield died in Memphis, Tennessee on October 18, 2003 of a sudden cardiac arrest.

Discography

References

1927 births
2003 deaths
African-American male singer-songwriters
African-American Christians
Singer-songwriters from Mississippi
20th-century African-American male singers